The Boca de Quadra is a bay extending southwest from the Keta River to Revillagigedo Channel in Southeastern Alaska. It is located almost entirely within Misty Fjords National Monument.

Name origin
The bay was named in 1792 for Juan Francisco de Bodega y Quadra by  Jacinto Caamano, in relation to Quadra's expeditions and surveys in the region in 1775–79.  The name was adopted by Captain George Vancouver, RN who explored this estuary on August 6, 1793.

References

Bays of Alaska
Alexander Archipelago
Spanish history in the Pacific Northwest
Bodies of water of Ketchikan Gateway Borough, Alaska
Bays of Prince of Wales–Hyder Census Area, Alaska